Boca (Piedmontese: Bòca, Lombard: Boca) is a comune (municipality) in the Province of Novara in the Italian region Piedmont, located about  northeast of Turin and about  northwest of Novara.

Boca borders the following municipalities: Cavallirio, Cureggio, Grignasco, Maggiora, Prato Sesia, and Valduggia.

Monument 
One of the most important churches in Boca is Santuario del Santissimo Crocifisso, The biggest Church in Boca. There are some other churches in the village:

 Chiesa Parrocchiale
 Chiesa della Madonna delle Grazie
 Chiesa di san Rocco
 Chiesa della Madonna della Neve (fraz. Baraggia).

Next to the Sanctuary there is the Natural Park of Mount Fenera

Boca DOC
The commune of Boca is home to the Denominazione di origine controllata (DOC) wine which includes 15 hectares (37 acres) producing a single red wine. The wine is a blend of 45-70% Nebbiolo, 20-40% Vespolina and up to 20% of Uva Rara (known locally as Bonarda Novarese). All grapes destined for DOC wine production need to be harvested to a yield no greater than 9 tonnes/ha. The wine is the required to be aged in barrels for at least 2 years with another additional year of aging in the bottle before it can be released to the public. The finished wine must attain a minimum alcohol level of 12% in order to be labelled with the Boca DOC designation.

References

External links
 www.bocaitaly.com
 Site of Boca's Municipality

Cities and towns in Piedmont